Max Alexander Kretzschmar (born 12 October 1993) is an English professional footballer who plays for National League club Wealdstone.

Club career

Wycombe Wanderers
Prior to his career at Wycombe Wanderers, Kretzschmar played for Southampton between the ages of 10 and 14, before being released. He went onto make his professional debut in a 1–0 victory against Morecambe on 3 August 2013. Before even making a league start, Kretzschmar opened his goal account by scoring both goals for Wycombe in their 2–1 win at Hartlepool United on 7 September 2013, having come on at half time for Nick Arnold.

On 9 May 2016, it was announced that Kretzschmar would leave the club upon the expiry of his contract on 30 June 2016, along with teammates; Gozie Ugwu, Alex Lynch and Ryan Sellers.

Woking
On 15 July 2016, Kretzschmar joined National League side Woking on a one-year deal.

On 6 August 2016, Kretzschmar made his Woking debut in a 3–1 home defeat against Lincoln City, replacing Ben Gordon in the 78th minute. On 20 August 2016, Kretzschmar was handed his first Woking start by manager Garry Hill in a 3–1 home defeat against Dagenham & Redbridge, before being replaced by Gozie Ugwu in the 73rd minute. On 1 January 2017, Kretzschmar scored his first Woking goal in a 2–1 home defeat against local rivals Aldershot Town, equalizing two minutes after Scott Rendell had given the visitors the lead. On 28 February 2017, Kretzschmar scored Woking's winner in their 1–0 victory against National League promotion hopefuls Dover Athletic, netting into an open goal after academy graduate, Charlie Carter had squared the ball. On the final day of the 2016–17 campaign, Kretzschmar scored in Woking's 1–1 draw with Dagenham & Redbridge, a goal which saw the Cards survival in the National League confirmed.

On 23 May 2017, it was announced that Kretzschmar would leave Woking upon the expiry of his current deal in June 2017.

Hampton & Richmond Borough
On 18 June 2017, following his release from Woking, Kretzschmar joined National League South side Hampton & Richmond Borough.

On the opening day of the campaign, Kretzschmar made his Hampton & Richmond debut during their 1–1 away draw with East Thurrock United, playing the full 90 minutes. A week later, he scored his first goal for the club during their 1–1 draw against Eastbourne Borough, curling home a free-kick in the 41st minute. In the month of September, Kretzschmar continued his impressive form, netting four times in five league games. On 2 December 2017, Kretzschmar netted his tenth goal in all competitions during Hampton & Richmond's league tie against Weston-super-Mare, completing the Beavers' comeback in the 79th minute to secure a 2–1 victory. On 6 May 2018, during Hampton & Richmond's National League South play-off campaign, Kretzschmar scored the winning goal during their semi-final fixture against Chelmsford City, converting a penalty in the 1–0 win. During their play-off final against Braintree Town, Kretzschmar scored the opening goal 1–1 draw, before Reece Grant equalised for Town before the break. Braintree went onto win 4–3 on penalties after extra time and were in turn, promoted back to the National League.

Return to Woking
On 13 July 2018, Kretzschmar made his return to Woking under previous manager, Alan Dowson following his switch from Hampton. On the opening day of the 2018–19 campaign, Kretzschmar marked his Woking return with the winner in their 1–0 away victory over East Thurrock United, converting a penalty with seconds remaining. Kretzschmar went onto continue his impressive scoring streak, with goals against Oxford City, Hemel Hempstead Town, Eastbourne Borough and a crucial penalty against promotion rivals, Billericay Town. On 14 November 2018, he netted his 10th and 11th goals of the season, during a thrilling 4–3 encounter with Gloucester City. On 5 May 2019, during Woking's play-off semi final against Wealdstone, Kretzschmar netted a crucial equaliser in the 86th minute and the Cards eventually went onto win the game 3–2, courtesy of a last minute effort from Jake Hyde. A week later, Kretzschmar was part of the side that triumphed over Welling United in the National League South play-off final to secure promotion back to the National League at the first time of asking.

On 4 July 2019, Kretzschmar signed a new one-year deal with the Cards, following their promotion back to the National League. On 19 October 2019, Kretzschmar netted his first goal of the campaign during a 1–1 away draw with Ebbsfleet United in their FA Cup fourth round qualifying tie, converting a 91st minute penalty to take the fixture to a replay, which the Cards eventually lost 1–0. He went onto score on three more occasions, collating twenty-seven appearances in all competitions, before the campaign was curtailed due to the COVID-19 pandemic.

On 9 July 2020, Kretzschmar secured a new one-year deal with the club following a disrupted 2019–20 campaign. On 3 October 2020, he went onto net his first goal of the season, scoring the equaliser during a 2–1 home victory over Solihull Moors. Following this, Kretzschmar went onto enjoy his most successful campaign in the National League to date, scoring seven goals in thirty-one appearances, with an additional three goals in cup competitions, taking his tally to ten for the season.

Ahead of the 2021–22 campaign, Kretzschmar penned a further one-year deal and went onto net a decisive brace in the Cards' opening fixture of the season against Wealdstone, in which the Surrey-based side were victorious, 2–1. After finishing the campaign as the club's top joint scorer alongside Inih Effiong and Tahvon Campbell with 13 goals to his name, Kretzschmar opted to leave the club at the end of his contract in June. During his second spell back at Kingfield, he collated 142 appearances, scoring 41 goals.

Wealdstone

On 8 July 2022, Kretzschmar signed for fellow National League side Wealdstone. Kretzschmar made his Wealdstone debut on 6 August 2022, getting two assists in a 3–2 win over Bromley. On 4 September 2022, he scored his first goal for the club, converting a penalty in a 1-1 draw against his former side Woking.

Personal life
Kretzschmar was educated at Hampton School in south west London.

Career statistics

References

External links

1993 births
Living people
Footballers from Kingston upon Thames
English footballers
Association football midfielders
Wycombe Wanderers F.C. players
Woking F.C. players
Wealdstone F.C. players
Hampton & Richmond Borough F.C. players
English Football League players
National League (English football) players